The Anthony P. Travisono Intake Service Center is a maximum-security state men's prison in Cranston, Rhode Island, owned and operated by the Rhode Island Department of Corrections.  The facility opened in 1985, and has an operational capacity of 1118 prisoners.

References

External links
Anthony P. Travisono Intake Service Center

Prisons in Rhode Island
Buildings and structures in Cranston, Rhode Island
1985 establishments in Rhode Island